The 2010–11 MOL Liga season was the third edition of the international ice hockey championship for teams from Hungary and Romania. This season nine teams participated, including defending champions Vasas Budapest Stars, the second team of Erste Bank Eishockey Liga outfit SAPA AV19 Székesfehérvár and HSC Csíkszereda from Szekler Land.

Teams

Regular season

Standings

Last updated on 16 December 2010.

Individual statistics

Scoring leaders 

The following players led the league in points at the conclusion of the regular season.

Leading goaltenders

The following goaltenders led the league in save percentage at the end of the regular season.

Playoffs

After the regular season the seven best placed teams qualified automatically for the playoffs, while the eighth and ninth placed teams decided the one remaining playoff place in a best-of-three series. The teams are drawn together according to their final result in the regular season.

Pre-qualifying 

All times are local (UTC+1).

Újpesti TE have won the series to 2–0 and thus qualified for the playoffs.

Playoff bracket 

HSC Csíkszereda have won the best-of-seven series final to 4–1 and took the MOL Liga title.

References

External links
 MOL Liga Official Website
 MOL Liga on Scoresway ice hockey site

2010–11 in European ice hockey leagues
2010-11
2010–11 in Hungarian ice hockey
2010–11 in Romanian ice hockey